Listed below are some Hebrew prayers and blessings that are part of Judaism that are recited by many Jews. Most prayers and blessings can be found in the Siddur, or prayer book. This article addresses Jewish liturgical blessings, which generally begin with the formula:

Transliteration: 

Translation: "Blessed are You,  our God, King of the universe..."

Pronunciation
In the transliterations below, ' is used to refer to the sh'vah, which is similar/equivalent to ə; a mid-word aleph, a glottal stop; and a mid-word ayin, a voiced pharyngeal fricative ʕ similar/equivalent to Arabic . Whenever ` is used, it refers to ayin whether word-initial, medial, or final. 'H/h' are used to represent both he, an English h sound as in "hat"; and ḥes, a voiceless pharyngeal fricative ħ equivalent to Arabic . Whenever 'ḥ' is used, it refers to ḥet. Resh is represented by an 'r,' though it's equivalent to Spanish 'r,' Spanish 'rr,' or French 'r,' depending on one's dialect. In all other regards, transliterations are according to the modern Hebrew pronunciation, based on the Sephardi tradition.

Daily prayers

Waking up

Pesukei d'zimra 

This portion of the prayers acts as an introduction to the morning prayers. The following is the order of Nusach Ashkenaz:

Shema and its blessings 
The Shema prayers is said every day in Shacharit and Maariv. There are always two blessings before the Shema, but after the Shema in the day there is only one blessing, and at night there are two (or three in some communities).

Amida
The "standing [prayer]", also known as the Shemoneh Esreh ("The Eighteen"), consisting of 19 strophes on weekdays and seven on Sabbath days and 9 on Rosh haShana Mussaf. It is the essential component of Jewish services, and is the only service that the Talmud calls prayer. It is said three times a day (four times on Sabbaths and holidays, and five times on Yom Kippur). 
The source for the Amida is either as a parallel to the sacrifices in the Temple, or in honor of the Jewish forefathers.

The prayer is divided into 3 sections, blessings of praise for God, requests for our needs (or exalting the holiness of the day for Shabbat and Yom Tov) and finally blessings of thanksgiving.

Praise

Middle blessings
On a regular weekday there are 13 blessings that ask God for our needs. A small number of rabbis, such as David Bar-Hayim based on fragments from the Cairo Geniza say only 12 blessings here.
On fast days in the times of the Talmud there were a number of additional blessings, and in communities today a 14th blessing is added to the Chazzan's repetition on fast days.

On Shabbat and Yom Tov there is only a single blessing.

During Mussaf of Rosh HaShana there are 3 blessings in the middle, each built around 10 verses from the Tanach around a particular theme.

Thanksgiving

Additions during the repetition

Concluding prayers

Kaddish
An Aramaic prayer which focuses on the idea of magnification and sanctification of God's name. There are five versions of kaddish for different purposes.

Additional poetry used regularly in prayers

Other prayers

Blessings on the mitzvot

Shabbat 
These blessings are also relevant to the festivals with some minor changes to the wording.

Holiday blessings
When any of these blessings are done for the first time that year, the blessing of she'he'cheyanu is said.

Mitzvot not associated with festivals

Blessings on pleasures, sights and sounds

Blessings during a meal

N'tilat Yadayim (Ritual washing of hands)
The hands are ritually washed before partaking of certain staples of life.

In the Ashkenazic tradition and some Sephardic and other communities, it is done before eating bread. In some Sephardic rites and in the German community originating in Frankfurt it is done before drinking wine and or eating bread, alone or with the wine (such as would be done before a Sabbath or festive meal) at which time this blessing is said:

After washing but before drying the hands, the following blessing below is said.

Blessing prior to food

After the meal

The combined blessing of Birkat Hamazon is made only after eating a meal containing bread (including matza) made from one or all of wheat, barley, rye, oats, spelt.

After Birkat Hamazon, many Sephardic Jews of the Spanish and Portuguese rite recite Ya Comimos or sing Bendigamos. These prayers are similar in content to Birkat Hamazon.

Blessings for smells

Blessings on sights and sounds

Blessings on special occasions

See also
 Berakhah
 Birkat Hachama  
 Shuckling
 Siddur

References

External links
 Judaism 101: Common Prayers and Blessings
 Sidduraudio.com: Texts and Audios of selections from the Siddur
 Chabad.org: Jewish Prayers in English and Hebrew
 Brochos.com – A comprehensive guide to blessings
 

Jewish blessings